Nymburk is a town in the Central Bohemian Region of the Czech Republic. It has about 15,000 inhabitants. It is situated on the Elbe River. The town centre is well preserved and is protected by law as an urban monument zone.

Administrative parts
The town is made up of two administrative parts: Nymburk and Drahelice.

Geography

It lies in the Central Elbe Table lowland within the Polabí region. The town is situated on both banks of the Elbe River, and lies at the confluence of the Elbe and Mrlina rivers.

History

The town was founded around 1275 by King Ottokar II of Bohemia. Throughout the Middle Ages it was one of the most important and strategic towns in the kingdom, as it protected Prague and was an important pillar of royal power.

During the reign of Wenceslaus II, the Gothic Church of St. Nicholas (today the Church of St. Giles) and the Dominican monastery were constructed. The town was surrounded by burnt-brick walls with about fifty towers and two defensive ditches fed from the Elbe. The Hussite Wars in the 15th century affected the town only slightly (the Dominican monastery was looted) and so the town prospered until the beginning of the 17th century.

During the Thirty Years' War, Nymburk was burned and looted, and the fortifications were almost completely destroyed. The recovery was disrupted by large fires. The turning point in the town's modern history was the introduction of the railway in 1870. Since then, the town has grown, new buildings have been built, the river Elbe has been regulated, and a new bridge and a hydroelectric power plant with a lock chamber have been built. The town has expanded beyond the medieval walls (some portions of which have been preserved). However, the original medieval floor plan has been completely preserved.

Demographics

Economy
The Nymburk Brewery, on the southern end of the town, was founded in 1895. With a production of about 200,000 hl/year, it is considered a medium-sized brewery in the Czech Republic. The brewery produces beer under the brand Postřižinské.

JDK is a large company that manufactures refrigeration equipment in Nymburk and exports it all over the world. Since 2005, the Chinese company Changhong has used a factory in Nymburk for the final assembly of LCD TVs for the European market.

Transport
Nymburk is an important railway junction at the crossing of four railway lines. The I/38, II/330 and II/331 highways pass through the town. Urban transport is provided only by buses.

Sport
The town is home to Basketball Nymburk, the most successful club of the Czech National Basketball League. It plays its home games at the Sportovní centrum.

Since 2015, an annual international rink bandy tournament has taken place in Nymburk. In 2017, the Federation of International Bandy decided to make the Nymburk tournament official.

The town's football club is SK Polaban Nymburk.

Sights

The dominant feature of the town is the Gothic brick Church of Saint Giles, built in 1280–1380. This church, together with the preserved buildings of the Nymburk fortification, is a unique example of brick Gothic (originally North German) architecture in the Czech lands. The main landmark of the square is a rare Renaissance town hall from 1526.

Besides the preserved sections of the town walls, the town also features a road bridge from 1913, which connects the town centre with the neighborhood of Zálabí. Other important cultural monuments of Nymburk are the Turkish tower (the former waterworks from 1597), the Plague column (built in 1717), the Chapel of St. John of Nepomuk (originally a part of the Dominican monastery), the Bohumil Hrabal Grammar School, the Nymburk Synagogue, the Tourist Information Centre, the water tower and the Old Fisher House.

In literature
Bohumil Hrabal, who grew up in the town, wrote about Nymburk in his books The Little Town Where Time Stood Still, Cutting It Short, Beautiful Sadness, Harlequin's Millions and Closely Watched Trains.

Notable people
Bohuslav Matěj Černohorský (1684–1742), composer and organist
Josef Kramolín (1730–1802), painter
Antonín Janoušek (1877–1941), journalist and politician
Karel Dostal (1884–1966), actor
Bohumil Hrabal (1914–1997), writer; lived here in his childhood and youth
Miroslav Macháček (1922–1991), theatre director and actor
Vratislav Effenberger (1923–1986), literature theoretician
Radek Bejbl (born 1972), footballer
Jan Bořil (born 1991), footballer
Martin Fuksa (born 1993), canoeist

Twin towns – sister cities

Nymburk is twinned with:
 Neuruppin, Germany
 Porto San Giorgio, Italy
 Vrútky, Slovakia

 Żarów, Poland

Gallery

References

External links

 
Cities and towns in the Czech Republic
Populated places in Nymburk District
Populated places established in the 1270s